Slime was a toy product manufactured by Mattel, sold in a plastic trash can and introduced in February 1976. It consisted of a non-toxic viscous, squishy and oozy green or other color material made primarily from guar gum. Different variations of Slime were released over the years, including Slime containing rubber insects, eyeballs, and worms.

The late 1970s also introduced a Slime Monster board game; the object of the game was to avoid having your game piece slimed on by a foot-tall plastic monster that had slime oozing from its mouth. Other toy companies have produced their own slime such as Hordak's Slime Pit playset as part of the Masters of the Universe toys in the 1980s, and Ecto-Plazm play gel sold with selected figures in Kenner's Real Ghostbusters toy line. Playmates Toys' Teenage Mutant Ninja Turtles figure line also had Retro-mutagen slime sold in containers and included with playsets.

While the substance was non-toxic, it was extremely difficult to remove from soft furnishings.

Chemical components
The main components are the polysaccharide guar gum, and sodium tetraborate. As an alternative to the polysaccharide, other alcohol-group containing polymers (such as polyvinyl alcohol) may be used to a similar result. These non-polysaccharide polymer products are more often referred to as flubber. Due to its ingredients, leaving the slime outside its container could cause the slime to dry or get stuck in fabric or one's hair.

Cultural impact 
Slime has expanded into other franchises such as Masters of the Universe, Teenage Mutant Ninja Turtles, and Ghostbusters. The Masters of the Universe slime toy features Hordak, an antagonist from Masters of the Universe. Created by Kenner, Ghostbusters slime had different colors of slime, due to the food coloring Kenner added to it. It then expanded into action toys and a playset. For the Teenage Mutant Ninja Turtles, the slime is called Retromutagen Ooze, a reference to how the turtles were made. The slimes were later added to toy sets. The Teenage Mutant Ninja Turtles slime line is made by Playmate. Slime use has expanded to various Nickelodeon game shows, including ['Super Sloppy'] Double Dare and -- most notably -- Nickelodeon Kids' Choice Awards, though the composition and history differs from that of the toy slime.

See also

 Flubber (material), rubbery polymer commonly called slime
 Gunge
 Nickelodeon toys, various substances marketed to children as toys, some of which were similar to Slime
 Silly Putty, another jelly substance obtained from cross-linking polyvinyl alcohol chains with borate anions

References

External links
How to make rainbow slime?

Products introduced in 1976
1970s toys
1980s toys
1990s toys
Action figures
Mattel
Non-Newtonian fluids
Sensory toys